is a Japanese weightlifter. He competed in the men's flyweight event at the 1992 Summer Olympics.

References

External links
 

1967 births
Living people
Japanese male weightlifters
Olympic weightlifters of Japan
Weightlifters at the 1992 Summer Olympics
Place of birth missing (living people)